Björn Harmsen (born 19 July 1982) is a German basketball coach. He is the current head coach of Science City Jena. He started his coaching career in 2005, with Jena.

In 2016, Harmsen achieved promotion to the first-tier Basketball Bundesliga with Science City Jena.

References

1982 births
German basketball coaches
Sportspeople from Göttingen
Science City Jena coaches
Gießen 46ers coaches
Mitteldeutscher BC coaches
Living people